"Popsicle" is a song written by Buzz Cason and Bobby Russell for the American rock band Jan and Dean. The song was originally released on their 1963 album Drag City.

Background
After Jan Berry's near fatal car accident near Dead Man's Curve in 1966, Dean Torrence had one last effort to save Jan & Dean's name by releasing a new album with "Popsicle" as the title track. The new album consisted of all previously released songs. Popsicle was then released as a single with the B side being a remake of The Beatles' "Norwegian Wood (This Bird Has Flown)".

Performers
 Jan Berry: Lead vocals
 Dean Torrence: Backing vocals and harmony

Chart performance
"Popsicle" hit as high as 21 on the Billboard Hot 100 in the later half of 1966 when it was rereleased as a single.

References

Jan and Dean songs
Songs written by Bobby Russell
1966 singles
Songs written by Buzz Cason
1963 songs
Liberty Records singles